The 2022 S5000 Australian Drivers' Championship, known by its sponsored identity the Nulon S5000 Australian Drivers' Championship, was the second season of the S5000 Australian Drivers' Championship. Joey Mawson, last years reigning champion, won the title again, marking only the ninth time in 60 years of Gold Star competition where the championship was successfully defended.

Teams and drivers 
The following teams and drivers were competing in the 2022 championship:

Race calendar 
The second S5000 season was originally supposed to start in late 2021, but after multiple postponements and cancellations, the organizers instead decided to hold a revived Tasman Series over the end of 2021, and start the second S5000 season in January 2022. In November 2021, it was announced that the S5000 series would take part in the 2022 Darwin Triple Crown.
On December 15, the full calendar was released for the Australian and Tasman Championships. On 17 January 2022, Sydney was confirmed to hold the fourth round of the championship. On June 2, 2022, the sixth round at Sandown Raceway, scheduled for September, was cancelled to avoid a three-month break between the last two rounds.

Race results

Season report 
The 2022 S5000 Australian Drivers' Championship began in February at Symmons Plains, with defending champion Joey Mawson overtaking pole-sitter James Golding at the start of the first race and then leading him to the flag. Josh Fife won the second race, his second-ever S5000 race in the only round he competed in, leading home Tim Macrow, while Mawson retired. This meant his car had to be repaired for the main event, which was done with only seconds to spare. Macrow then won the main event as his closest competitor Golding ran off the circuit in the first part of the race. Mawson's tumultuous weekend meant Macrow led the championship by 13 points after the first round, ahead of Cooper Webster.

As the championship headed to Phillip Island, Golding once again took pole position, this time he was able to hold off Mawson in the first race and became the fourth different winner in as many races. Blake Purdie started first in race two, but was overtaken by Zane Goddard and Macrow, with the former running off the road, handing the latter the lead and the race win. The main event was a close battle between Golding and Mawson, with the latter surviving a late safety car restart to come out on top. Macrow only managed fourth place in race three, which meant his championship lead came down to just a single point over Mawson, with Golding and Webster tied in third.

The round in support of the Formula 1 Australian Grand Prix at Albert Park saw a surge in entry numbers, almost doubling to 16 drivers. It was still Mawson on top though, first achieving pole position in qualifying and then winning the first race - albeit only just, as new entry and reigning Tasman Series champion Aaron Cameron almost capitalized on a last-lap mistake by the leader. Shae Davies then won a shortened race two that ended under the safety car due to an incident involving James Davison and Goddard. Mawson was back on top for the main event, comfortably leading home Nathan Herne and Macrow and taking the championship lead in the process.

Sydney was the host of the penultimate round of the championship, with only eight cars entered. Mawson continued where he left off in Melbourne, getting pole position again even though he spun in qualifying. He then beat Cameron to win a thrilling first night race in S5000 history as his closest championship rival Golding retired with a broken steering arm. Webster led from lights to flag in race two, achieving his second win in the category. Cameron then finally claimed his first Gold Star win in the main event, charging to the front after a collision with Mawson on lap one. Mawson left Sydney with a 55-point cushion to second-placed man Macrow, who was a further 30 points ahead of Golding.

As the sixth round of the championship was cancelled, the S5000 debut at Hidden Valley Raceway turned into a championship decider. Herne claimed his first pole position in a qualifying interrupted by a heavy crash by Tim Berryman. His triumph didn't even last a single corner though, as Webster took the lead in race one and then won without being challenged again. Kaleb Ngatoa took his third victory in the category in race two, while a conservative sixth place for Mawson was enough to secure his championship defense. Cameron then won his second consecutive main event from pole, as Macrow lost third in the championship due to a non-finish.

Golding, Webster and Macrow had no answer to Mawson's pace over the season, and in the end his advantage was over 70 points to Golding in second. Behind him, it was very competitive though, with only nine points between second and fourth. The upswing in regular entries that was hoped for after 2021 sadly didn't happen, as only five drivers competed for the full season, but the strong field for the Formula 1-supporting third round still showed that interest in the championship was steadily growing.

Drivers' standings 
At each meeting, a qualifying session and three races were held. Meeting points were awarded to the fastest ten qualifiers in qualifying, where the grid for Race 1 was set. For Race 2, the top 75% from qualifying were reversed. The grid for the Main Event was defined by the points earned by the drivers across the weekend.

See also 

 2022 S5000 Tasman Series

References

External links

 2020 S5000 Australia Series Sporting and Technical Regulations, motorsport.org.au, as archived at web.archive.org on 6 June 2020

Australian Drivers' Championship
S5000 Australian
S5000 Australian